Azziz Irmal (born June 2, 1980) is a retired Algerian footballer. He played as a defender.

References

1980 births
Living people
Algerian footballers
MC Alger players
CR Belouizdad players
Tersana SC players
Expatriate footballers in Egypt
CS Constantine players
ASM Oran players
US Chaouia players
Amal Bou Saâda players
Association football defenders
21st-century Algerian people